John Francis O'Reilly (19 August 1888 – 11 March 1942) was an Australian politician.

He was born in Newtown to dancing teacher John O'Reilly and Winifred Ward. A hairdresser, he was active in the Hairdressers' Employees' Union, becoming vice-president in 1910, president in 1911, assistant secretary in 1912, and secretary in 1942. From 1931 to 1934 he was a Labor member of the New South Wales Legislative Council. O'Reilly died in North Sydney in 1942.

References

1888 births
1942 deaths
Australian Labor Party members of the Parliament of New South Wales
Members of the New South Wales Legislative Council
20th-century Australian politicians